Tridrepana finita is a moth in the family Drepanidae. It was described by Watson in 1957. It is found in China (Sichuan, Yunnan, Tibet).

Adults are similar to Tridrepana sadana and Tridrepana rubromarginata, but the subterminal line of the forewings is wavy, thin and indistinct. Furthermore, the brown shade from the apex to the middle of the inner margin in T. rubromarginata is lacking in T. finita.

References

Moths described in 1957
Drepaninae